The 4th Beijing College Student Film Festival was held in 1997 in Beijing, China.

Awards
 Best Film Award: The Day the Sun Turned Cold, On the Beat
 Best Actor Award: Zhu Xu for The King of Masks
 Best Actress Award: Ning Jing for The Bewitching Braid
 Best Visual Effects Award: The Sorrow of Brook Steppe
 Best First Film Award: Huo Jianqi - Winner
 Artistic Exploration Award: Love Talk
 Committee Special Award: The King of Masks
 Special Recognition Award: Xie Jin

References

External links

Beijing College Student Film Festival
1997 film festivals
1997 festivals in Asia
Bei